Hugh Kennedy & Company was a Scottish automobile manufacturer, known for the Ailsa model, from 1907 to 1910.

History
Hugh Kennedy founded the company in 1907 in Glasgow and began the production of automobiles. Production ended in 1910. Hugh Kennedy was later involved with the Rob Roy automobile

Cars
The Ailsa had a 15/20 HP, front-mounted, four-cylinder engine driving the rear axle. The original price was £395.

See also
 List of car manufacturers of the United Kingdom

References

Other sources
 Harald Linz, Halwart Schrader: Die Internationale Automobil-Enzyklopädie. United Soft Media Verlag, München 2008, .
 George Nick Georgano (Chefredakteur): The Beaulieu Encyclopedia of the Automobile. Volume 2: G–O. Fitzroy Dearborn Publishers, Chicago 2001, . (englisch)

Defunct motor vehicle manufacturers of Scotland
History of Glasgow
Companies based in Glasgow